Needle lace  is a type of lace created using a needle and thread to stitch up hundreds of small stitches to form the lace itself.

In its purest form, the only equipment and materials used are a needle, thread and scissors. The origins of needle lace date back to the 16th century in Italy, and its origins may be found in the openwork on linen technique called reticella. A variety of styles developed where the work is started by securing heavier guiding threads onto a stiff background (such as thick paper) with stitches that can later be removed. The work is then built up using a variety of stitches—the most basic being a variety of buttonhole or blanket stitch. When the entire area is covered with the stitching, the stay-stitches are released and the lace comes away from the paper.

Needle lace is also used to create the fillings or insertions in cutwork.

References

External links 

  Kenmare Lace And other forms of Irish Lace
 Needlelace - Lace Identification and Types
Old Point Lace: How to Copy and Imitate It (1878) by Daisy Waterhouse Hawkins. Chatto and Windus, London.